Kompakt: Total 9 or Total 9 was released on 18 August 2008. The album is the ninth installment of the Cologne-based microhouse label's annual compilation of vinyl releases and exclusives from its biggest artists and most promising newcomers.

Track listing

Disc One
 Justus Köhncke – "No Thanks for the Add" (6:31)
 DJ Koze – "Zou Zou" (7:52)
 Superpitcher vs. The Congosound – "Say I’m Your Number One (Superpitcher Remix)" (8:11)
 Jürgen Paape – "Come Into My Life" (7:30)
 Matias Aguayo – "Minimal" (6:34)
 Supermayer – "Hey Hotties!" (6:35)
 Jörg Burger  – "Modernism Begins At Home" (5:00)
 Superpitcher – "Disko ! (You Don’t Care)" (7:17)
 Partial Arts – "Telescope" (8:30)
 Thomas Fehlmann – "With Wings" (6:55)
 Burger/Voigt – “Wand Aus Klang” (7:32)

Disc Two
 Dubshape – "Droplets (Early Night Mix)" (7:42)
 Jonas Bering – "Can’t Stop Loving You" (6:01)
 Robert Babicz – "Don’t Look Back" (7:20)
 Nightguy – "Pretty Face" (7:43)
 Gui Boratto – "Anunciación” (6:25)
 The Rice Twins – "The Signifier" (5:59)
 Nicolas Stefan – "Time Is Over" (7:04)
 kaito – "Everlasting Dub" (9:39)
 SCSI-9 – "Another Day Acid" (7:58)
 Maxime Dangles – "Tulipa" (7:29)
 Freiland – "Geduld" (5:06)

External links

2008 compilation albums
Kompakt compilation albums
Record label compilation albums
Microhouse albums